Faulkener (also sometimes spelt as Faulkner) is an 1807 historical tragedy by the British writer William Godwin. The play premiered at the Theatre Royal, Drury Lane on 16 December 1807. The cast included Robert Elliston as Faulkener, Henry Siddons as Stanley, Harriet Siddons as Lauretta, Jack Palmer  as Benedetto, William Powell as Orsini and Jane Powell as Arabella.

References

Bibliography
 Greene, John C. Theatre in Dublin, 1745-1820: A Calendar of Performances, Volume 6. Lexington Books, 2011.
 O'Shaughnessy, David. The Plays of William Godwin. Routledge, 2016.
 Marshall, Peter. William Godwin: Philosopher, Novelist, Revolutionary. PM Press,  2017.
 Nicoll, Allardyce. A History of Early Nineteenth Century Drama 1800-1850. Cambridge University Press, 1930.
 Robertson, Ben P. The Diaries of Elizabeth Inchbald. Taylor & Francis,  2022.

1807 plays
West End plays
British plays
Historical plays
Plays set in the 17th century
Plays set in Italy
Works by William Godwin